State Route 176 (SR 176) is part of Maine's system of numbered state highways, located in Hancock County. The  route runs in a vertical zig-zag direction, but it is mostly signed as an east–west route. The western terminus of the route is at SR 175 in Brooksville and its eastern terminus is at U.S. Route 1 (US 1) and SR 3 in Orland.

Junction list

References

External links

Floodgap Roadgap's RoadsAroundME: Maine State Route 176

176
Transportation in Hancock County, Maine